Sascha Bürringer (born 3 September 1975) is an Austrian former footballer.

References

1975 births
Living people
Association football midfielders
Austrian footballers
Austrian Football Bundesliga players
SK Rapid Wien players
Wiener Sport-Club players